Kilmardinny is a loch in Bearsden, East Dunbartonshire, Scotland. The loch is renowned for coarse fishing and its abundance of perch and roach. Situated nearby is Kilmardinny House, which, after being owned by a succession of Glaswegian merchants and the Glasgow MP Robert Dalglish, was donated to the East Dunbartonshire Council and is now used as an arts and culture centre.

The loch is featured in a survey of historic gardens and designed Landscapes carried out for the East Dunbartonshire Council.

References

Lochs of East Dunbartonshire